Léry is a small town situated along the south shore of Lake Saint-Louis in Quebec, Canada. The population as of the Canada 2011 Census was 2,307. Located on Route 132 west of Châteauguay and east of Beauharnois in the administrative region of Montérégie, the town is home to the Bellevue Golf Club, with its two 18-hole courses.

Demographics 

See also
 List of cities in Quebec

References

External links
 
Ville de Léry

Cities and towns in Quebec
Incorporated places in Roussillon Regional County Municipality
Quebec populated places on the Saint Lawrence River
Greater Montreal